Stratus may refer to:

Weather
Stratus cloud, a cloud type
Nimbostratus cloud, a cloud type
Stratocumulus cloud, a cloud type
Altostratus cloud, a cloud type
Altostratus undulatus cloud, a cloud type
Cirrostratus cloud, a cloud type

Music
Stratus (English band), a 1980s hard rock band
Stratus (Serbian band), a heavy metal band formed in 2002
"Stratus" (song), by Moments in Grace, 2004
"Stratus", a song by Billy Cobham from Spectrum, 1973

Technology
Dodge Stratus, an automobile
Stratus Technologies, a technology firm
Swing Stratus, a German paraglider design

People
Trish Stratus (born 1975), Canadian professional wrestler
Teresa Stratas, Canadian soprano of 36-years at the Metropolitan Opera

Places
Strati, Crete, a village in Crete
Stratus (Acarnania), a city of ancient Acarnania, Greece
The ancient name for the city of Stratos (Achaea)
Stratus (building), a high-rise building in Seattle, Washington, US

See also
Stratos (disambiguation)
Stratum, a layer of sedimentary rock or soil